The Hansel Mountains are a  long mountain range located in north Utah on the northern border of the Great Salt Lake.

Located in northeast Box Elder County, the southwest of the range abuts the Locomotive Springs State Wildlife Management Area; the northeast end of the range ends at a lower elevation divide between the North Hansel Mountains that lie on the Utah-Idaho border. Snowville lies on Deep Creek in the Sage Valley to the northwest. Interstate 84 travels northwest-southeast through the mountain divide. The mountain range continues southwest and south and ends at Monument Point overlooking the Great Salt Lake to the south, and the wildlife management area to the west.

Peaks
The highest elevation in the mountains is an unnamed peak  on the southeast ridge of the range. Monument Peak, is located at the southwest end of the range.

References

External links
Utah Peaks List, Box Elder County-(Monument Peak information)
Monument Peak (Hansel Mountains), mountainzone.com (coordinates, (elevation))

Mountain ranges of Box Elder County, Utah
Mountain ranges of the Great Basin
Mountain ranges of Utah